Andre Begemann and Martin Emmrich were the defending champions, but decided not to participate.
Juan Sebastián Cabal and Robert Farah won the tournament after defeating Facundo Bagnis and Eduardo Schwank 7–5, 6–2 in the final.

Seeds

Draw

Draw

References
 Main Draw

Seguros Bolivar Open Cali - Doubles
2011 Doubles